Lil Uzi Vert vs. the World (shortened L.U.V. vs. the World) is the third mixtape by American rapper Lil Uzi Vert. It was released on April 15, 2016, by Generation Now and Atlantic Records, serving as their second commercial release with Atlantic.The mixtape features production from Cubeatz, Don Cannon, Lyle LeDuff, Maaly Raw, Metro Boomin and WondaGurl. A sequel was released on March 13, 2020.

Singles
The lead single from the mixtape, called "Money Longer" was released on February 6, 2016. The track was produced by Don Cannon and Maaly Raw.

The other two singles from the mixtape, "You Was Right" and "Ps & Qs" were released on April 15, 2016 with the rest of the mixtape. The first track was produced by Metro Boomin, and second by Don Cannon.

Cover art

The artwork was designed by 20-year-old St. Louis artist Fvrris, sourcing the art of Bryan Lee O’Malley, whose
Scott Pilgrim vs. The World is referenced in the album’s title. The cover art transforms Lil Uzi Vert into an anime style character in reference to Scott Pilgrim. They are featured with a depiction of their own love interest, Brittany Byrd, lying atop their head, in reference to Ramona Flowers. The background is filled with a mob of people, who appear to be enviously gazing at Uzi, emulating their "haters" it could also be a reference to the seven deadly ex's (Scott Pilgrim). Uzi, however, seems to only be bothered about the girl on their head. One person is spinning a basketball on their finger. This is an allusion to Brittany, who played basketball before meeting Uzi, as revealed by Nardwuar in an interview. Two cameras flash directly at Uzi in order to portray the newfound fame Uzi have accumulated. In front of the two girls kissing, there is a bass guitar that has "Rage" engraved on its side, altogether alluding to Uzi's previous project Luv Is Rage. The use of a colourful, psychedelic background highlights the cloud rap genre Uzi use in the mixtape.

Commercial performance
Lil Uzi Vert vs. the World peaked at number 37 on the US Billboard 200 and spent a total of 55 weeks on the chart. It also peaked at number 18 on the US Top R&B/Hip-Hop Albums chart. The mixtape was eventually certified platinum by the Recording Industry Association of America (RIAA) for combined sales and album-equivalent units of over 1,000,000 units in the United States.

Track listing

Charts

Weekly charts

Year-end charts

Certifications

References

2016 mixtape albums
Albums produced by Don Cannon
Albums produced by WondaGurl
Albums produced by Metro Boomin
Albums produced by Cubeatz
Atlantic Records albums
Lil Uzi Vert albums